Bucciarelli is an Italian surname. Notable people with the surname include:

Antonio Bucciarelli (born 1970), Italian footballer 
Brunetto Bucciarelli-Ducci (1914–1994), Italian politician and magistrate
Gerald Anthony Bucciarelli (1951–2004), American actor

Italian-language surnames